Abattoir Blues may refer to:

 Abattoir Blues (novel), a 2014 novel by Peter Robinson
 Abattoir Blues / The Lyre of Orpheus, a 2004 album by Nick Cave and the Bad Seeds